St. John's Cathedral is a Romanesque cathedral in the Lebanese city of Byblos. The church is dedicated to St. Jean Mark, Byblos' patron saint and founder of the town's initial Christian community.

History
The church was constructed in 1115 by the Crusaders, originally known as the Cathedral of Saint John the Baptist. A number of environmental disasters hit the structure including earthquakes, and the church fell into disrepair until 1764, when Yusuf Shihab donated the block to the Lebanese Maronite Order; they restored the building and reopened it in 1776. Shelling during the Oriental Crisis of 1840 once more inflicted damage, but it was repaired; the church is open for visitors today.

Gallery

References

Buildings and structures completed in 1115
Churches in Lebanon
Crusader churches